USS Corregidor (AVG/ACV/CVE/CVU-58) was the fourth of fifty s built to serve the United States Navy during World War II. Launched in May 1943, and commissioned the following August, she was originally named for Anguilla Bay, in Maurelle Island, in the Alexander Archipelago, of Alaska.

Design and description

Corregidor was a Casablanca-class escort carrier, the most numerous type of aircraft carriers ever built, and designed specifically to be mass-produced using prefabricated sections, in order to replace heavy early war losses. She displaced  standard,  with a full load. She was powered by two Skinner Uniflow reciprocating steam engines which drove two shafts, providing  and enabling her to make . Her compact size necessitated the installment of an aircraft catapult at her bow, and there were two aircraft elevators to facilitate movement of aircraft between the flight and hangar deck: one each fore and aft.

One /38 caliber dual-purpose gun was mounted on the stern. Anti-aircraft defense was provided by eight Bofors  anti-aircraft guns in single mounts, as well as 12 Oerlikon  cannons, which were mounted around the perimeter of the deck. Casablanca-class escort carriers were designed to carry 27 aircraft, but the hangar deck could accommodate more, which was often necessary during transport or especially training missions, due to the constant turnover of pilots and aircraft.

Construction
Ordered as HMS Atheling, she was laid down as Anguilla Bay, was reclassified ACV-58 on 20 August 1942, and launched as Corregidor on 12 May 1943, by the Kaiser Shipbuilding Company, of Vancouver, Washington, under a Maritime Commission contract; sponsored by Mrs. J. Hallett.  She was reclassified CVE-58 on 15 July 1943, acquired by the Navy on 31 August 1943; and commissioned the same day.

Service history

World War II
Clearing San Diego, California, on 26 October 1943, Corregidor joined Carrier Division 24 (CarDiv 24) at Pearl Harbor for air strikes in the Gilbert Islands invasion from 10 November-6 December. She returned to San Diego, to undergo repairs and load aircraft and men, then resumed operations out of Pearl Harbor, with her division. From 22 January-3 March 1944, she sailed in the Marshall Islands operation, providing air cover for the invasion of Kwajalein.

Corregidor put to sea on 11 March 1944, for Guadalcanal, arriving there on 21 March. With the 3rd Fleet, she sortied on 30 March, to provide air cover for the landings on Emirau Island, returning to Port Purvis, on Florida Island, on 14 April. Two days later, she sailed to join the 7th Fleet for air operations at Hollandia (currently known as Jayapura), between 22–26 April, then put into Manus Island, for replenishment and antisubmarine patrols until 4 May. Embarking Commander, Carrier Division 24 for the Marianas operation, Corregidor provided combat air patrols and anti-aircraft support for the invasion of Saipan, from 15–25 June, with her aircraft accounting for at least eight enemy planes. She covered the logistics force off Eniwetok, from 1–3 July, then aided in the softening up bombardment of Guam, and provided air cover for the invasion until 28 July, when she returned to San Diego, for overhaul.

She worked on qualifying pilots in carrier operations at Pearl Harbor, from 12 October-21 November 1944. On 26 October, she formed as a hunter-killer group with EscDiv 64, around to check out reported enemy submarine movements between Pearl Harbor and California. On 2 January 1945, this group moved to patrol the area between Pearl Harbor and Eniwetok, to protect heavy Allied shipping, returning to Pearl Harbor, on 13 February.

Corregidor sailed from Pearl Harbor, on 27 February, to search for an overdue plane carrying Lieutenant General M. F. Harmon, USA, arriving at Majuro, on 20 March. From 21 March-27 April, she conducted an anti-submarine patrol in the vicinity of Japanese-held Wotje and Maloelap, in the Marshalls, then off Eniwetok. Future U.S. Congressman Ralph Hall flew off the Corregidor during this time.

Post-War
Returning to Pearl Harbor on 4 May 1945, Corregidor was assigned duty as a training ship in Hawaii, conducting carrier pilot qualifications until the end of the war. From 2 October 1945 – 10 January 1946, she alternated this duty with three voyages from Pearl Harbor to San Diego, to return homeward-bound servicemen. Corregidor cleared San Diego on 18 January 1946, for Norfolk, Virginia, arriving there on 4 February. Here she was placed out of commission in reserve on 30 July 1946.

Korea

Recommissioned on 19 May 1951, Corregidor was assigned to operate with the Military Sea Transport Service (MSTS). She ferried men, aircraft, and aviation cargo to NATO nations under the Mutual Defense Assistance Plan, but also made five voyages through the Panama Canal, to bring men and cargo to the United Nations forces in Korea, in 1952-1954. Corregidor was reclassified T-CVU-58 on 12 June 1955. When the Lebanon crisis broke in the summer of 1958, Corregidor was at Brindisi, Italy, and immediately lifted two reconnaissance planes of the 24th Infantry Division, and 10 helicopters to support the landings in Lebanon. Returning to the United States, the ship suffered hull damage in the Atlantic Ocean due to high seas on the night of 2 April 1958. She was transiting from Barcelona, Spain to NAS Pensacola, Florida, with 20 officers and 150 enlisted men. She made an emergency stop-over in the Azores. Corregidor was decommissioned on 4 September 1958, and sold for scrap on 28 April 1959.

Awards
Corregidor received four battle stars for her World War II service.

Citations

General sources

Online sources

Bibliography

 
 

 

Casablanca-class escort carriers
World War II escort aircraft carriers of the United States
Korean War aircraft carriers of the United States
Cold War auxiliary ships of the United States
Ships built in Vancouver, Washington
1943 ships
S4-S2-BB3 ships